The Cairo Commercial Historic District is a  historic district that was listed on the National Register of Historic Places in 1994.

It had 31 contributing buildings, mostly on North and South Broad Street, but also on Railroad Avenue and on Second Avenue and one on First Street.

It includes:
Citizens Bank (c. 1908), 128 South Broad Street, a Neoclassical Revival building with a vault design
115 South Broad Street, a three-story building with paired stone pilasters
Zebulon Theater (1936), 207 North Broad Street, a two-story, brick building with Art Deco influence
United States Post Office (1935), 203 North Broad Street, a Stripped Classical building built with funds from the Federal Emergency Administration of Public Works (FEAPW, a Public Works Administration forerunner).  It has a New Deal mural, "Products of Grady County", by Paul Ludwig Gill.
Three, one-story brick warehouses (1909) on Railroad Avenue
Cairo Depot (c.1880), formerly the Atlantic Coastline Depot, which in 1994 was the Cairo Police Station, a stucco-over-masonry building with overhanging eaves, brackets, and a large hipped roof.
W. B. Roddenbery Building where cane syrup was produced for Walter Blair Roddenbery's business originated by his father Dr. Seaborn Anderson Roddenbery.  Seaborn Roddenbery was the son and grandson respectively.

References

External links
 

Historic districts on the National Register of Historic Places in Georgia (U.S. state)
Neoclassical architecture in Georgia (U.S. state)
Art Deco architecture in Georgia (U.S. state)
Buildings and structures completed in 1866
National Register of Historic Places in Grady County, Georgia